The debate over democracy in China has been a major ideological battleground in Chinese politics since the 19th century. China is not a Western-style liberal democracy. The Chinese government and the Chinese Communist Party (CCP) state that China is democratic nonetheless. Many foreign and some domestic observers categorize China as an authoritarian one-party state, with some saying it adheres to neoauthoritarianism. Some characterize it as a dictatorship.

The Constitution of the People's Republic of China (PRC) states that its form of government is "people's democratic dictatorship". The Constitution also holds that China is a one-party state that is governed by the CCP. This gives the CCP a total monopoly of political power which it frequently exercises. All political opposition is illegal. Currently there are eight political parties in China other than the CCP that are legal, but all have to accept CCP primacy to exist. The CCP says that China is a "socialist democracy", in which the CCP is the central authority and acts in the interest of the people.

China is considered internationally to be amongst the least democratic countries in the world. Freedom of speech, freedom of assembly and freedom of religion are all severely restricted by the government. The general Chinese public has virtually no say on how the top leaders of the country are elected. Censorship is widespread and dissent is harshly punished in the country.

During a visit to Europe in 2014, CCP general secretary Xi Jinping said that a multi-party system would not work for China. He said China had experimented in the past with various political systems, including multi-party democracy, warning that copying foreign political or development models could be catastrophic because of its unique historical and social conditions. Currently, Xi has strengthened the CCP's control over the government and in 2018 amended the party and state constitutions to include Xi Jinping Thought, described as the next stage of socialism with Chinese characteristics. In that same year, the Chinese government has also abolished term limits for the presidency, allowing Xi to rule for life.

Qing dynasty 

The first introduction of the concept of modern democracy into China is credited to exiled Chinese writer Liang Qichao. In 1895, he participated in protests in Beijing for increased popular participation during the late Qing dynasty, the last ruling dynasty of China. It was the first of its kind in modern Chinese history. After escaping to Japan following the government's clampdown on anti-Qing protesters, Liang Qichao translated and commented on the works of Hobbes, Rousseau, Locke, Hume, Bentham and many other western political philosophers. He published his essays in a series of journals that easily found an audience among Chinese intelligentsia hungering for an explanation of why China, once a formidable empire of its own, was now on the verge of being dismembered by foreign powers. In interpreting Western democracy through the prism of his strongly Confucian background, Liang shaped the ideas of democracy that would be used throughout the next century. Liang favored gradual reform to turn China into a constitutional monarchy with democracy. The goal of the Hundred Days' Reform was to reform China into such as system, but it was rapidly reversed in the Wuxu Coup.

Liang's great rival among progressive intellectuals was Dr. Sun Yat-sen, a republican revolutionary. Sun felt that democracy would be impossible as long as the Qing monarchy still existed. Democracy was part of his platform, the Three Principles of the People (三民主義) – the principle of the people under 1 nation (nationalism), the principle of the people's rights (democracy), and the principle of the people's livelihood and well-being (civility, decency and respect). Like Liang, Sun agreed that democracy, or at least universal suffrage, could not happen overnight in a country with high illiteracy rates and a lack of political consciousness. Sun's Three Stages of Revolution called for a period of "political tutelage" where people would be educated before elections can occur.

Responding to civil failures and discontent, the Qing Imperial Court responded by organizing elections. China's first modern elections were organized by Yuan Shikai for Tianjin's county council in 1907. In 1909, 21 of 22 provinces, with the exception being Xinjiang, held elections for provincial assemblies and municipal councils. Requirements were strict; only those that passed the imperial exams, worked in government or military, or owned 5000 yuan of property may vote or run for office. This essentially limited the electorate to the gentry class. Hundreds of thousands voted and the winners were overwhelmingly constitutional monarchists, followers of Liang Qichao. The provincial assemblies elected half of the 200 member national assembly, the other half was selected by regent Prince Chun. All of these assemblies became hotbeds of dissent against the Qing as they were protected by freedom of speech. In 1909, the Qing government held parliamentary elections.

Republic of China, 1912–present 

When the 1911 Revolution began, it was the provincial assemblies that provided legitimacy to the rebels by declaring their independence from the Qing Empire. The national assembly also issued an ultimatum to the Qing court. Delegates from the provincial assemblies were sent to Nanjing to publicly legitimize the authority of the provisional government of the Republic of China founded on 1 January 1912. They later also formed the provisional senate. The limited acts passed by this government included the formal abdication of the Qing dynasty and some economic initiatives.

In late 1912, national elections were held with an enlarged electorate, albeit still small proportionally to the national population. Sun's Nationalist Party dominated both houses of the National Assembly. Song Jiaoren, the incoming Nationalist prime minister, was assassinated in March 1913 before the assembly's first session. A police investigation implicated sitting prime minister Zhao Bingjun while popular belief was that provisional president Yuan Shikai was behind it. This led to the failed Second Revolution against Yuan. Victorious, Yuan forced the National Assembly to elect him president for a five-year term then purged it of Nationalists. Without a quorum, the assembly was dissolved.

After Yuan's death in 1916, the National Assembly reconvened until it was dissolved again the following year by Zhang Xun's coup attempt to restore the Qing. Prime Minister Duan Qirui refused to reconvene the National Assembly, opting instead to hold elections for a new assembly more favorable to him. As a result, a rump of the old assembly moved to Guangzhou to start a rival government in southern China. In northern China, 17 provinces elected a new assembly dominated by Duan's Anfu Club in 1918. This new assembly was dissolved following Duan's defeat in the Zhili–Anhui War of 1920.

President Xu Shichang organized elections for a third assembly in 1921, but with only 11 provinces voting it never had a quorum and thus never convened. That was the last attempt to hold national elections until 1947. All assemblies were dissolved after the Nationalists' Northern Expedition.

The formation of the Nationalist one-party state in 1927 implemented the late Sun's "political tutelage" program, which forbade elections until the people were considered properly educated. All other parties were kept out of government until 1937 when the impending Second Sino-Japanese War led to the United Front and the formation of the People's Political Council which included the smaller parties. In 1940, partly in response to tensions in the United Front, Mao Zedong offered the new CCP doctrine, New Democracy. New Democracy was an intermediary stage unlike western parliamentary, electoral democracy but not yet communism. After the war, the Nationalist's "political tutelage" ended with the promulgation of the Constitution of the Republic of China. The 1947 National Assembly and 1948 legislative elections were boycotted by the Communists which held most of northern China. As a result, the Nationalists and their junior coalition partners, the Chinese Youth Party and China Democratic Socialist Party, won.

Taiwan, 1945–present

In 1945, after the Surrender of Japan, governance of Taiwan was transferred to the Republic of China. The ceding of Taiwan was formalized under the Treaty of Taipei in 1952. After the governmental exodus from mainland China to the island of Taiwan in 1949, martial law was imposed following the February 28 Incident in 1947. The period of martial law lasted for 38 years and 57 days from 19 May 1949 to 15 July 1987. During this period, The Republic of China was governed as a de facto one-party state under the Kuomintang although it maintained its status as a de jure parliamentary republic.

On 28 September 1986, the Democratic Progressive Party was founded as an alternate party to the Kuomintang. Since the lifting of martial law in 1987, the ROC has had two major political parties, the Kuomintang and the Democratic Progressive Party. Since then, smaller parties have split from the two main parties and formed as new groups, largely within the Pan-Blue Coalition and Pan-Green Coalition. Until 1996, the President of the Republic of China was elected by the National Assembly. In 1996, the Republic of China electoral code was amended to allow for direct election of the President via plurality voting.

The Pan-Blue Coalition consists of the Kuomintang, the People First Party (PFP), New Party (CNP), and Minkuotang (MKT). The Pan-Blue parties traditionally favor Chinese unification under a democratic China, with some moving towards a position supporting the present status quo with eventual unification with China.

The Pan-Green Coalition consists of the Democratic Progressive Party, Taiwan Solidarity Union (TSU), Taiwan Independence Party (TAIP), and Taiwan Constitution Association (TCA). The Pan-Green traditionally favor Taiwanese independence.

People's Republic of China, 1949–present 

China continuously elucidates "socialist democracy with Chinese characteristics", trying to portray itself as a democratic country, but explicitly distinguishing itself from the liberal democratic system, which is seen "unfit" to China's "unique conditions". In PRC definition, democracy has meant the Marxist–Leninist concepts of people's democratic dictatorship and democratic centralism. In this viewpoint, CCP acts as the representative of the Chinese public. CCP general secretary Xi Jinping has additionally coined the term "whole-process people's democracy", also called "whole-process democracy" which he said "put the people as masters" and that in it "all major legislative decisions are made only after democratic deliberations and thorough procedures to ensure sound and democratic decision-making". He said that "whole-process democracy" had four pillars:

 process democracy and achievement democracy
 procedural democracy and substantive democracy
 direct democracy and indirect democracy
 people's democracy and will of the state

At the key to claims that China is democratic is the claim the CCP itself is inherently democratic. In this viewpoint, decisions by the central CCP leadership are discussed at all levels in "democratic life meetings" under the principle of democratic centralism. Additionally, CCP claims that it considers other shareholders and interests through "consultative democracy", as long as they do not challenge the CCP priorities, with the main channel for this being the Chinese People's Political Consultative Conference (CPPCC). The CPPCC is an institutional component of the CCP's "people's democracy" and united front strategy, which provides a "seat" for the eight small legally-permitted parties and independent nonparty "friends."

Another claim is that the CCP practices intra-party democracy, which has been repeatedly emphasized and expounded by the CCP as an alternative to liberal democratic ideals characterized by multiparty elections and competition.

China practices electoral democracy with regard to its people's congresses, a practice that began in the communist areas during the Chinese Civil War. The operation of people's congresses were set out in the Electoral Law of 1953 and have been subsequently revised. Currently there are five levels of people's congresses. From more to less local, they are: (1) people's congresses in villages, minority nationality townships, and towns; (2) people's congresses of cities that are not sub-divided, municipal districts, counties, and autonomous counties; (3) people's congresses in sub-districts of larger cities and in autonomous prefectures; (4) people's congresses in provinces, autonomous regions, and municipalities directly administered by China's central government; and (5) the National People's Congress. Direct elections occur at the two most local levels, while the members at the higher levels are indirectly elected, i.e., elected by those elected in the lower levels. The National People's Congress is officially China's highest organ of state power. However, nominations at all levels are controlled by the CCP, and CCP's leading position is enshrined in the state constitution, meaning that the elections have little way of influencing politics. Additionally, elections are not pluralistic as no opposition is allowed.

CCP's rule over China is widely considered to be authoritarian by political scientists.

History
The People's Republic of China (PRC) was initially based on Mao's concept of "New Democracy", not the immediate "dictatorship of the proletariat". New Democracy incorporates a coalition of classes subsumed under the leadership of the Communist Party and the working class. This coalition of classes is symbolized by the four smaller stars on the flag of China: workers, peasants, intellectuals, and the national bourgeoisie. Soon, however, Mao called for establishing the "people's democratic dictatorship", and it has since been reflected in the Chinese constitution.

In the Democracy Wall movement of 1978 to 1979, movement participants argued that "democracy" was the means to resolve conflict between the bureaucratic class and the people, although the nature of the proposed democratic institutions was a major source of disagreement among participants. A majority viewed the movement as part of a struggle between correct and incorrect notions of Marxism. Many participants advocated classical Marxist views that drew on the Paris Commune for inspiration. The Democracy Wall movement also included non-Marxists and anti-Marxists, although these participants were a minority.

Starting in the 1980s, in the period of Opening and Reform, the government organized village elections in which several candidates would run.

Leaders of the post-Mao reforms in the 1980s argued that the Party's record under Mao was bad, but that the Party reformed without being forced. The American political scientist Andrew Nathan concluded that "the reforms aimed to change China from a terror-based, totalitarian dictatorship to a 'mature,' administered dictatorship of the Post-Stalinist Soviet or Eastern European type." "Democracy" would not involve elections or participation in decision making but "the rule of law", which was based on procedural regularity in the exercise of power.

In the spring of 1989, student leaders of the Chinese Democracy Movement expressed demands for democracy in terms which deliberately recalled the demands of the May Fourth Movement, which led to the 1989 Tiananmen Square protests. Intellectual leaders such as Liu Xiaobo and Fang Lizhi supported their calls for participation in government and procedures to fight corruption. In December 2008, more than 350 intellectual and cultural leaders, including Liu Xiaobo, issued Charter 08. The Charter said China remains the only large world power to still retain an authoritarian system that so infringes on human rights, and "This situation must change! Political democratic reforms cannot be delayed any longer!"

21st century 
In December 2008, more than 350 intellectual and cultural leaders, including Liu Xiaobo, issued Charter 08.

Chinese premier Wen Jiabao called for more democracy in 2011, having generally been regarded as a political reformer during his career. However, Wu Bangguo, chairman of the Standing Committee of the National People's Congress, said in 2011 that "we have made a solemn declaration that we will not employ a system of multiple parties holding office in rotation", having said similar remarks during his career. This was reported by BBC News of showing a split in China's leadership, although the general leadership is said to weigh closer to Wu's comment.

After Xi Jinping became CCP general secretary in 2012, Amnesty International said that human rights in China have become worse. In 2013, a CCP memo called "Document Number 9" was leaked, which warned against "Western constitutional democracy" along with other Western ideas. Human rights abuses are rejected by the government, which insists the country is run according to law. In 2021, in response to the Summit for Democracy held by US president Joe Biden, the State Council of China released a white paper called China: Democracy That Works which praised China's "whole-process democracy", said that "there are many ways to achieve democracy" and disparaged American democracy as "performative." The white paper describes China's position that "There is no single road to democracy. The true barrier to democracy lies not in different models of democracy, but in arrogance, prejudice and hostility towards other countries’ attempts to explore their own paths to democracy, and in assumed superiority and the determination to impose one's own model of democracy on others."

China has consistently been ranked amongst the lowest as an "authoritarian regime" by the Economist Intelligence Unit's Democracy Index, ranking at 148th out of 167 countries in 2021.

Special Administrative Regions, 1997–present 

As European colonies, Hong Kong and Macau were denied democratic governments until very late in the colonial period. Official memos from CCP leaders, threatening the British government if they were to hold elections in Hong Kong, were repeatedly sent from the 1950s onwards. Hong Kong got its first elections in the 1980s, and Macau in the 1990s.

Both Hong Kong and Macau have legislatures; 35 of Hong Kong's 70 legislators are directly elected, as are 14 of Macau's 33. Also, like grassroots elections in China, Hong Kong does hold elections for the district councils, which act as consultants to the government. Following electoral reforms implemented by the Mainland government, the legislature of Hong Kong following the 2021 general election will only have 20 out of 90 members directly elected.

Hong Kong

The first Chief Executive election saw the Chief Executive elected by a 400-member Selection Committee in 1996, then by 800-member Election Committee in 2002, 2005, 2007, and then 1200-member Election Committee in 2012 and 2017.

The Legislative Council of Hong Kong from 1997 to 2004 had 60 seats with 24 were directly elected, six elected from an 800-member electoral college known as the Election Committee of Hong Kong, and 30 elected from FCs. Elections in 2004 and 2008, had 30 members were directly elected by universal suffrage from geographical constituencies (GCs) and 30 were elected from functional constituencies (FCs). From 2012 onwards, The Legislative Council consists of 70 elected members, 35 members were directly elected by universal suffrage from geographical constituencies and 35 were elected from functional constituencies.

There have been many attempts with many different ideas to introduce universal suffrage since the handover. Electoral reform in Hong Kong was seen as an avenue for political liberalization in China; the universal suffrage reform package which would allow Hongkongers to vote for the chief executive but the chief executive first needed to be approved by a committee. The law failed to pass Hong Kong's legislative council when pan-democrats voted against the package and most of the pro-Beijing members walked out.

In 2014, Hong Kong experienced massive protests against the Chinese government's universal suffrage reform package, as the candidates would have to "love the country, and love Hong Kong" and would "protect the broad stability of Hong Kong now and in the future" to be able to stand for election. The universal suffrage reform package failed to pass Hong Kong's legislative council when the majority voted against the package.

Macau
The first Macao Legislative Council in 1996 had 23 members: eight of whom were directly elected (GC), eight indirectly (FC), and seven nominated by the Chief Executive. Its second Legislative Council (2001) had four more members: two more directly elected and two more indirectly. Its third and fourth (2005 and 2009) legislative councils had 29 members, and the fifth (2013) and sixth (2017) have 33.

The first Chief Executive of Macau was elected by the 200-member Chief Executive Selection Committee in 1999, 2004 and 2009 saw the Chief Executive elected by 300-member Election Committee, and 400-member Election Committee in 2014 and 2019.

Surveys 
Very few comprehensive surveys have been done to understand the popular support for or against democracy. A 1990 survey from Andrew Nathan and Tianjian Shi reported that 55% of people surveyed agree that "China needs more democracy now", but 76% agreed that Chinese democracy depends on the leadership of the Chinese Communist Party. They also reported that a sizeable proportion feared the negative aspects of democracy, 36% agreed that too many parties would "cause political chaos."

Surveys done with the World Values Survey and the East Asia Barometer in 2001 and 2002 shows high explicit support for democracy. 
In the survey, 96% answered either "fairly good" or "very good" to the question "Do you think having a democratic political system is....". Moreover, 81% of respondents agreed with the statement "democracy may have problems but it is better than any form government." When asked to compare authoritarianism or democracy, only 5% of respondents said that an authoritarian government can be preferable, with 20% saying it does not matter. When chosen to rate out of 10 how suitable democracy is for China, only 2% gave a rating lower than 5, 96% gave a 6 or higher, 76% giving an 8, 9 or 10. Nevertheless, 60 to 70% of respondents feared some democratic practices may cause negative effects. 26% agreed or strongly agreed with the statements "in democracy the economic systems runs badly." 35% agreed with that statement "democracies are indecisive and have too much quibbling." 18% agreed with the statement "democracies aren't good at maintaining order."

An Asian Barometer survey from 2014 to 2016 had 76% of Chinese respondents agreeing that democracy was capable of solving the problems in their society. However, when asked to rate the level of democracy in their own government on a 10-point scale, they gave an overall rating of 6.5 (the 7th highest percentage out of 14 different regions surveyed).

Zhengxu Wang of Fudan University in Shanghai wrote in a report in 2007: "It is clear that public support for democracy is high in China. Public opinion surveys show that more than 90% of Chinese citizens believe that having a democracy is good. But the majority is not yet ready for a major effort towards democratization because they still see economic growth and social stability as more important than freedom of speech, political participation, and other democratic rights."

A report of two Stanford professors, Jennifer Pan and Yiqing Xu, done between 2018 and 2019 showed that a majority of Chinese people believed that the government had no right to interfere in how many children people had, and that the government should allow public expression of negative views of government policies. The poll also showed that Chinese people with higher income or Chinese students studying in the US being more politically and economically liberal.

A 2020 Harvard University study conducted yearly since 2003 found that Chinese citizens' trust in their government has increased each year, "virtually across the board." The 2022 Edelman Trust Barometer found that 91% of Chinese citizens trust their government.

In 2022, a poll by the Alliance of Democracies Foundation found that 91% of Chinese say democracy is important to them, with an 81% saying that China is a democracy.

See also

 Federalism in China

References

Further reading 

Daniel Bell, East Meets West: Human Rights and Democracy in East Asia (Princeton, N.J.: Princeton University Press, 2000).
Daniel Bell, Beyond Liberal Democracy: Political Thinking for an East Asian Context (Princeton, N.J.: Princeton University Press, 2006).
Edmund S. K. Fung, In Search of Chinese Democracy: Civil Opposition in Nationalist China, 1929–1949 (Cambridge; New York: Cambridge University Press, 2000. Cambridge Modern China Series). xviii, 407p. 
Hu, Shaohua. Explaining Chinese Democratization (Westport, CT: Praeger, 2000).
Liu Jianfei (刘建飞), Democracy and China (Beijing: New World Press, 2011). 178 p. 
Holbig, Heike, und Günter Schucher (2016), "He who says C must say D"—China's Attempt to Become the "World's Largest Democracy", GIGA Focus Asia, 02, June, 2016

 
Politics of China
China